Yevgeny Nikolayevich Biryukov (born 19 April 1986) is a Russian professional ice hockey defenceman who currently plays with Salavat Yulaev Ufa of the Kontinental Hockey League (KHL).

Playing career
Before joining Salavat he previously served as an alternate captain for Metallurg Magnitogorsk of the KHL. He played the first 13 seasons since the inception of the KHL with Magnitogorsk, claiming two Gagarin Cups before leaving the club as a free agent following the 2019–20 season.

On 8 May 2020, he signed a one-year contract with near rival club, Salavat Yulaev Ufa.

Career statistics

Regular season and playoffs

International

Awards and honors

References

External links

1986 births
Living people
Metallurg Magnitogorsk players
Russian ice hockey defencemen
Salavat Yulaev Ufa players